Nationality words link to articles with information on the nation's poetry or literature (for instance, Irish or France).

Events
 Joachim du Bellay returns to France from Rome, where he had accompanied (as a secretary) his cousin, Cardinal Jean du Bellay, on a visit that began in 1553.

Works published

Great Britain
 John Heywood, A Breefe Balet Touching the Traytorous Takynge of Scarborow Castell, patriotic ballad about the capture of Scarborough Castle in April of this year by Thomas Stafford, who held it for two days before the earl of Westmoreland took it
 Henry Howard, Earl of Surrey, Certain Bokes of Virgiles Aeneis, translated from Virgil's Aeneid, Books 2 and 4 (Book 4 translation first published in 1554)
 Thomas Tusser, describing the farmer's year, month by month (expanded edition 1562; see also  1573)
 Richard Tottel, editor, better known as Tottel's Miscellany, including the first publication of original poems by Henry Howard, Earl of Surrey (beheaded 1547) and Sir Thomas Wyatt (died 1542)

Other
Giovanni Battista Giraldi, Ercole, Italy
 Olivier de Magny, Les Souspirs d'Olivier de Magny ("Sighs"), France

Births
Death years link to the corresponding "[year] in poetry" article:
 Jean de Sponde (died 1595), French poet, writer, translator and humanist

Deaths
Birth years link to the corresponding "[year] in poetry" article:
 Gutierre de Cetina died about this year (born 1520), Spanish
 Cristovao Falcao died about this year (born 1518), Portuguese
 Hayâlî (خيالى)  (born c. 1500) Ottoman
 Jean Salmon Macrin died (born 1490), French, Latin-language poet

See also

 Poetry
 16th century in poetry
 16th century in literature
 Dutch Renaissance and Golden Age literature
 French Renaissance literature
 Renaissance literature
 Spanish Renaissance literature

Notes

16th-century poetry
Poetry